Yee Wo Street is a street in East Point and Causeway Bay, Hong Kong Island, Hong Kong. Its junction with Hennessy Road is one of the busiest junctions in Hong Kong.

Name
Yeewo was the Cantonese name of a Qing dynasty hong established by Wǔ Guóyíng in Canton in 1783, which later became the leader of the cohong of the Thirteen Factories under the stewardship of Howqua, who took over in 1803. The name was later used by trading company Jardine, Matheson & Co., owners of much land in East Point in the early days of Hong Kong.

The road was renamed "Kasuga-dori" (春日通) during the Japanese occupation of Hong Kong. After the surrender and evacuation of the Japanese army, the name was reverted.

Features
The street begins west at Hennessy Road and ends east in Causeway Road. It hosts a section of Hong Kong Tramways and its Causeway Bay terminus. During the 2014 Hong Kong protests (aka "Umbrella Revolution"), substantial tracts of the area were occupied by suffragists.

See also
 List of streets and roads in Hong Kong

References

Causeway Bay
Roads on Hong Kong Island